The Montgolfier Brothers were a British indie pop-dream pop duo which featured gnac's Mark Tranmer and Lovewood drummer Roger Quigley.

The group, which formed in 1999, has released several recordings. Roger Quigley died 18 August 2020.

Discography

Seventeen Stars (1999)
Seventeen Stars was the band's debut recording. It was released on 4 May 1999 on the Vespertine label before the company folded. It was later reissued by Quarterstick in the United States, and by Alan McGee's Poptones elsewhere.

Track listing
"Time Spent Passing" – 2:16
"Even If My Mind Can't Tell You" – 6:14
"Pro-Celebrity Standing Around" – 1:45
"Four Days" – 5:05
"Seventeen Stars" – 6:12
"Low Tide" – 5:12
"In Walks a Ghost" – 5:17
"Une chanson du crépuscule" – 2:59 
"Between Two Points" – 6:02
"Fin" – 1:39

The World Is Flat (2002)

The World Is Flat was released in 2002 on the Poptones imprint.

Track listing
"2:55" – 2:47
"The Understudy" – 2:46
"Be Selfish" – 7:42
"The World Is Flat" – 5:09
"The Second Takes Forever" – 2:50
"Swings and Roundabouts" – 4:57
"Dream in Organza" – 4:56
"I Couldn't Sleep, Either" – 4:35
"Think Once More" – 3:32
"Inches Away" – 7:19

All My Bad Thoughts (2005)

References

External links
The Montgolfier Brothers on MySpace

Chickfactor interview

British indie pop groups
Musical groups established in 1999
Musical groups disestablished in 2020
1999 establishments in the United Kingdom